This is a list of dams and reservoirs in Asturias, Spain.

See also 
 List of dams and reservoirs
 List of dams and reservoirs in Spain

External links 

 Reservoirs status summary 

Water supply and sanitation in Asturias
Asturias